Donkey is the second album of Brazilian electro/rock band CSS, released on July 21, 2008. Seventeen songs were recorded at Trama Studios São Paulo, of which eleven appear on the album. Donkey follows their critically acclaimed debut album Cansei de Ser Sexy.

Three months before the release, bassist Iracema Trevisan left the band, being replaced by then-drummer Adriano Cintra. The new drummer is Englishman Jon Harper, formerly of The Cooper Temple Clause.

The album was released in Canada and the United States by label Sub Pop, in Europe by Warner Bros. Records, and Japan by KSR. In initial reviews of the album, critics noted a more polished approach to CSS' sound and production techniques.

The album was mixed by Mark "Spike" Stent.

Singles
The first single is "Rat Is Dead (Rage)", which was made available for free download on the band's official website on April 28, 2008. The second single, "Left Behind", was released physically on July 14, 2008 and charted at number 78 on the UK Singles Chart. The third single, "Move", was released on October 13, 2008. They shot a music video in Spain, directed by Keith Schofield, it can be seen on YouTube.

Chart performance
Donkey debuted at number 37 on the Irish Albums Chart, at number 32 on the UK Albums Chart, at number 22 on the Finnish Albums Chart, at number 54 on the French Albums Chart and at number 189 on the Billboard 200.

The song "Jager Yoga" featured in the video game FIFA 09 and "Rat Is Dead (Rage)" appeared in Midnight Club: Los Angeles.

Track listing
Official track listing:

"Jager Yoga" (Adriano Cintra/Ana Rezende dos Anjos/Carolina Parra/Luiza Sá/Lovefoxxx) – 3:48
"Rat Is Dead (Rage)" (Adriano Cintra) – 3:18
"Let's Reggae All Night" (Adriano Cintra/Lovefoxxx) – 3:54
"Give Up" (Adriano Cintra/Luiza Sá) – 3:20
"Left Behind" (Adriano Cintra) – 3:30
"Beautiful Song" (Adriano Cintra/Lovefoxxx) – 3:27
"How I Became Paranoid" (Adriano Cintra) – 3:25
"Move" (Adriano Cintra/Luiza Sá/Lovefoxxx) – 3:53
"I Fly" (Adriano Cintra) – 3:16
"Believe Achieve" (Adriano Cintra/Lovefoxxx) – 3:36
"Air Painter" (Adriano Cintra/Lovefoxxx) – 3:47

iTunes bonus track / pre-order only track (UK)
 "Hit and Run" – 3:02

Bonus disc ^^
"Hit and Run"
"Blackwing" (Adriano Cintra) ^
"I Fly" (demo) ^

Other recorded tracks
"You and Yourself"
"Dallas 141" (Adriano Cintra)
"Cannonball" (Kim Deal) ^
"Buenos Aires"

^ B-sides to "Left Behind" single.
^^ A limited bonus disc included as a gift for pre-orderers.

Personnel
 Adriano Cintra – bass, vocals, background vocals
 Lovefoxxx – vocals
 Ana Rezende aka Ana Rezende dos Anjos - guitars and keyboards
 Carolina Parra – guitar, background vocals
 Luiza Sá – guitar, keyboards, cowbell
 Jon Harper – drums

Charts

References

External links
 Donkey sampler
 Nova música do Cansei de Ser Sexy poderá ser baixada de graça
 Exclusivo: o G1 ouviu uma prévia do novo álbum do Cansei de Ser Sexy

2008 albums
CSS (band) albums
Sub Pop albums
Warner Records albums